Bryan Ciesiulka (born October 10, 1991) is an American professional soccer player.

Career

Youth
Ciesiulka played for Neuqua Valley High School in Naperville, Illinois. He was named a NSCAA/adidas All-American as a senior in 2009. He was named Gatorade Illinois Boys Soccer Player of the Year in 2009. Bryan also played for the Chicago Fire Academy from 2007-2010.

College
Ciesiulka played college soccer at Marquette University. While at Marquette, Bryan helped the Golden Eagles win the school's first Big East Conference Division Title in 2011. The Golden Eagles again won the Big East in his senior season in 2013. He was a three time captain at Marquette.  Prior to his senior season, Bryan was named to the Soccer America All-American team. Bryan was a Senior CLASS Award finalist in 2013. In 2013, Bryan was named Big East Midfielder of the Year, as well as making the All-Conference First Team. Bryan ended his career with 9 goals and 17 assists, while playing in 69 career games with 63 starts.

Professional
Ciesiulka was selected by the Chicago Fire in the 2014 MLS SuperDraft, but was released prior to the start of the season.  Ciesiulka signed shortly thereafter with Swedish club Gimo IF FK.

On February 13, 2015, USL club Saint Louis FC announced their signing of Ciesiulka.

Personal
Ciesiulka grew up in Naperville, Illinois.  Bryan is the son of Philip and Nancy Ciesiulka.  He has two sisters, Jenny and Katie.  Katie currently plays soccer at Marquette.

References

1991 births
Living people
American soccer players
Association football midfielders
Chicago Fire FC draft picks
Chicago Fire U-23 players
Marquette Golden Eagles men's soccer players
Saint Louis FC players
Soccer players from Illinois
Sportspeople from Naperville, Illinois
USL League Two players